La Celada is an aldea, or attached village, of the larger white pueblo of Iznájar in the southernmost part of the province of Córdoba, Spain.  With a population suggested to be in the region of 600, the primary economy of this aldea is olive picking. It is a village that, in the last 10 years, has acquired vehicles other than donkeys, and where the ancient traditions such as the annual Matansa are still practiced.

It is situated on a small hillock at the foothills of the Sierra Subbética.

The village has a bar, shop, hairdresser, school, Hojiblanca oil press, and guest house.

Municipalities in the Province of Córdoba (Spain)